Beatriz Rico (born 25 February 1970, in Avilés, Asturias) is a Spanish actress.

Biography
Rico spent most of her childhood and adolescence in Gijón, having studied high school at the Jovellanos Institute. At 19, she moved to Madrid to study drama and ballet. Rico has done work in cinema, theater, and as a singer and photographic model.

Filmography

Television

She has also had a continued career as a television actress, participating in numerous series, almost always comedies, a genre in which Beatriz Rico seems to have specialized:

Theatre
In theatre Rico played Doña Inés in a performance of Don Juan Tenorio in 1998. She has also worked on Momentos de mi vida (2000), by Alan Ayckbourn, Las señoritas de Aviñón (2001), along with María Asquerino, Los 39 escalones (2008 and 2012) and Las novias de Travolta (2011). In 2012 Rico interprets the monologue Mejor Viuda Que Mal Casada (2012–present). In 2016 he takes part in the assembly of Swingers, from Tirso Calero.

References

External links 

 

1970 births
People from Avilés
Actors from Asturias
Spanish stage actresses
Spanish film actresses
Spanish television actresses
Spanish television presenters
Living people
Spanish women television presenters
20th-century Spanish actresses
21st-century Spanish actresses